Tegeticula superficiella is a moth of the family Prodoxidae. It is found in the United States in south-western Utah and northern Arizona. The habitat consists of shrub desert and open pine forests.

The wingspan is 20.5–30 mm. The forewings are white and the hindwings are dark brown, but darker at the apex.

The larvae feed on Yucca elata var. utahensis, Yucca baileyi and Yucca angustissima var. kanabensis. They feed on developing seeds. Pupation takes place in a cocoon in the soil.

References

Moths described in 1999
Prodoxidae